Menangle railway station is a heritage-listed railway station located on the Main South line in the south-western Sydney settlement of Menangle in the Wollondilly Shire local government area of New South Wales, Australia. It is also known as Menangle Railway Station group. The property was added to the New South Wales State Heritage Register on 2 April 1999. The station opened on 1 July 1863.

Platforms & services
Menangle has two side platforms. It is serviced by NSW TrainLink Southern Highlands Line services travelling between Campbelltown and Moss Vale with 2 weekend morning services to Sydney Central and limited evening services to Goulburn.

Description 
The station complex comprises a type 1 station building and residence, erected in 1863; a brick WC block that was erected in 1863, however no longer extant, removed pre-2000; and a brick northbound platform and platform face at the Goulburn end on, also erected in 1863.

Transport links
Busabout operate two routes to and from Menangle station:
49: to Camden
889: to Campbelltown station

Heritage listing 
Menangle station group is one of the earliest station complexes to survive in the state. It is a combination station building and residence which has had substantial additions. Although the second platform and building have been demolished for a new platform the remaining up buildings and platform are of very high significance in the development of railway buildings. Significant features of this building are its lack of awning to the platform, the unusual planning of the building with detached wings, room for porters, no waiting room and the asymmetrical elevations. The remaining structures are of national significance in conjunction with the railway underbridge listed separately.

Menangle railway station was listed on the New South Wales State Heritage Register on 2 April 1999 having satisfied the following criteria.

The place possesses uncommon, rare or endangered aspects of the cultural or natural history of New South Wales.

This item is assessed as historically rare. This item is assessed as scientifically rare. This item is assessed as arch. rare. This item is assessed as socially rare.

See also

List of regional railway stations in New South Wales

References

Attribution

External links

Menangle station details Transport for New South Wales

Railway stations in Australia opened in 1863
Regional railway stations in New South Wales
Short-platform railway stations in New South Wales, 2 cars
New South Wales State Heritage Register
Articles incorporating text from the New South Wales State Heritage Register
Main Southern railway line, New South Wales
Wollondilly Shire